The 1996–97 Australian Athletics Championships was the 75th edition of the national championship in outdoor track and field for Australia. It was held from 27 February–2 March 1997 at the Olympic Park Stadium in Melbourne. It served as a selection meeting for Australia at the 1997 World Championships in Athletics. The men's 10,000 metres event took place separately at the Adelaide Grand Prix on 1 February 1997 while the women's 5000 metres took place at the Melbourne Nike Classic on 20 February 1997. The combined track and field events took place at the Hobart Grand Prix from 14–16 February 1997.

Medal summary

Men

Women

References

External links 
 Athletics Australia website

1997
Australian Athletics Championships
Australian Championships
Athletics Championships
Sports competitions in Melbourne
1990s in Melbourne
February 1997 sports events in Australia